Petar Kosturkov (born 10 September 1969) is a former Bulgarian footballer who is currently manager.

Career

A midfielder, between 1994 and 1996 Kosturkov played in 13 A PFG matches for Levski Sofia, becoming champion of Bulgaria at the end of the 1994–95 season. He also represented Pirin Blagoevgrad, Etar, Pirin Razlog, Dobrudzha, and Spartak Pleven, while also having a spell abroad with Austria Lustenau.

References

External links
 

1969 births
Living people
Bulgarian footballers
Association football midfielders
PFC Levski Sofia players
PFC Spartak Pleven players
PFC Dobrudzha Dobrich players
FC Etar 1924 Veliko Tarnovo players
SC Austria Lustenau players
First Professional Football League (Bulgaria) players
Bulgarian expatriate footballers
Expatriate footballers in Austria
Bulgarian expatriate sportspeople in Austria
Expatriate footballers in Germany
Bulgarian expatriate sportspeople in Germany
Bulgarian football managers
BV Cloppenburg managers